Asaripallam is a town in Nagercoil city corporation of Kanniyakumari district in the Indian state of Tamil Nadu.

Demographics
 India census, Asaripallam had a population of 12,743. Males constitute 50% of the population and females 50%. Asaripallam has an average literacy rate of 82%, higher than the national average of 59.5%; with 51% of the males and 49% of females literate. 10% of the population is under 6 years of age. The Kanyakumari Government Medical College is located at Asaripallam.

References

Cities and towns in Kanyakumari district